Choe Un-song (born 7 December 1992) is a North Korean short track speed skater. He is coached by Yun Chol.

Career
Choe is from Manpo, North Korea, where his father gave him a pair of skates, sparking his interest in speed skating. Choe first went to the Manpo Youth Sports School and continued training at the Ganggye-dong First Education University.

2018 Winter Olympics
Choe competed in the 2018 Winter Olympics in the men's 1500 metres discipline. He finished last in his heat with a time of 2:18.213 and did not advance to the semifinal, despite being enthusiastically cheered on by a group of 100 North Korean cheerleaders in the stands. Before the heat, he had been injured during a training session in Pyeongchang.

References

1992 births
Living people
North Korean male short track speed skaters
Olympic short track speed skaters of North Korea
Short track speed skaters at the 2018 Winter Olympics
Short track speed skaters at the 2017 Asian Winter Games
21st-century North Korean people